Joseph N. "Joby" Baker (born March 26, 1934) is a Canadian-born actor and painter.

Career
Baker was born in Montreal, Quebec. An early role in his career was in a 1958 episode of The George Burns and Gracie Allen Show, "Ronnie Makes A Record", where he was cast as a recording studio vocalist. In the early 1960s he made guest appearances on many television series. In 1962 he appeared on Perry Mason as Kenneth Carter in "The Case of the Bogus Books".  He also appeared as a semi-regular in the first season of the WWII TV series Combat! as Pvt. Kelly.

Other television series appearances included The Alfred Hitchcock Hour, Dr. Kildare and The Dick Van Dyke Show. In 1960 he co-starred with Jack Lemmon and Ricky Nelson in The Wackiest Ship in the Army. He appeared in the Elvis Presley movie Girl Happy (1965), and in all three Gidget movies.

In 1967, Baker was cast as a travelling magician, Dr. William Davis, in the episode "The Saga of Dr. Davis" on the syndicated series Death Valley Days, hosted by Robert Taylor. Judi Meredith played his wife, Jenny, whose death leads him to take an adopted son, Tad, on his remaining westward journeys.

Baker began a long association with Walt Disney Studios where he appeared in The Adventures of Bullwhip Griffin (1966), Blackbeard's Ghost (1968) and Superdad (1974).  In 1967–68, he had a lead role in Good Morning World, a short-lived sitcom about a pair of disc jockeys named Lewis and Clarke.  This was followed by a succession of character roles, including an appearance in an episode of the 1973 situation comedy A Touch of Grace and a stint as Colonel Marvin on the 1980 sitcom Six O'Clock Follies.

Personal life
Baker was first married to Joan Blackman, whom he met while both of them were in drama school. In 1984, he married lyricist and songwriter Dory Previn. He illustrated The Dory Previn Songbook, published in 1995. He has exhibited as an abstract painter in major Los Angeles art galleries.

References

External links

 

1934 births
Living people
20th-century Canadian painters
Canadian male painters
21st-century Canadian painters
Canadian male film actors
Canadian male television actors
Artists from Montreal
Male actors from Montreal
Canadian expatriate male actors in the United States
20th-century Canadian male artists
21st-century Canadian male artists